Peter Wilson is not to be confused with Peter J.D. Wilson, his team mate or Peter Y. Wilson, his son

Peter Wilson (born 9 December 1961 in Stranraer, Scotland) is an Irish curler.

In 1981, Wilson skipped his native Scotland to a gold medal at the 1981 World Junior Curling Championships over Denis Marchand of Canada. Three years later he skipped Scotland to a silver medal at the European Curling Championships, losing to Peter Attinger, Jr. of Switzerland. Wilson would not return to a major international tournament until 1997. In 1997 he returned to the European Championship as Douglas Dryburgh, third for Scotland. The team won the bronze medal. The next year he travelled with Dryburgh to the 1998 Winter Olympics and the team finished in seventh.

Wilson and Dryburgh would later move to Ireland. In 2004 Wilson skipped the Irish team at the European Championships finishing twelfth. The following year Dryburgh joined the team and skipped them and they finished in seventh qualifying them for the 2006 World Men's Curling Championship at the Worlds Ireland finished in last place.

Awards 
WJCC Sportsmanship Award – 1981

References

External links
 

1961 births
Living people
Irish male curlers
Scottish male curlers
British male curlers
Olympic curlers of Great Britain
Curlers at the 1998 Winter Olympics
People from Stranraer
Sportspeople from Dumfries and Galloway